Jerome D. Silberstein, owner of Silberstein, Awad & Miklos (Born May 27, 1924, Deceased February 20, 2005 at Stony Brook hospital in Stony Brook, New York) Silberstein, Awad & Miklos won the largest verdict of the year in 2002 in Nassau County. The 35 million dollar verdict was against hospital and pediatric neurology for negligent diagnosis and treatment of enzyme disorder. Silberstein is renowned for the 1986 "Personal Best" case against Dr. Dumbroff, which turned into a class action suit for about 100 injured by Dumbroff, who operated with his non-physician wife and chauffeur.

In 1987, the Dumbroff case resulted in record-setting settlement. Silberstein was a trial attorney for the Public Service Mutual Insurance Company and in a ten-year time frame never lost a single case. Some of his great legal victories were: Gallo, Fusfeld, & Baez. These cases were great victories for the client, the firm and the New York Bar Association. Each set historical precedents. The New York Law Journal named Jerome D. Silberstein's prior firm, Reichenbaum & Silberstein, as one of the five big winners in medical malpractice suits against the city in December 1987. Reichenbaum & Silberstein, having settled a case for $2.6 million, was second of the five top firms listed. Silberstein graduated from Brooklyn Law in 1950 and was a trial lawyer for 50 years.

He also represented The Dental Society. In February 1967, Silberstein won one of the largest cases in Nassau history for one, Arthur Lebowitz, who was run down and left with two fractured legs. Silberstein said, "Lebowitz was once an avid skier who would never again be able to indulge in the social and athletic activities that composed a substantial part of his life prior to the accident." The verdict was for 500K (an astronomical verdict for 1967) in damages to Mr. Lebowitz.

Trivia
Father to fashion designer Ivy Supersonic

1924 births
2005 deaths
New York (state) lawyers
20th-century American lawyers